Tribonanthes a genus of Australian plants endemic to Western Australia in the bloodwort family, Haemodoraceae.

It includes the species:
Tribonanthes australis Endl.  (The type species of the genus)
Tribonanthes brachypetala Lindl. 
Tribonanthes longipetala Lindl. 
Tribonanthes minor M.Lyons & Keighery 
Tribonanthes purpurea T.D.Macfarl. & Hopper 
Tribonanthes sp. Lake Muir (G.J. Keighery & N. Gibson 2134) 
Tribonanthes violacea Endl.

References

External links

 

 
Haemodoraceae
Commelinales genera
Commelinales of Australia
Angiosperms of Western Australia
Endemic flora of Western Australia
Taxa named by Stephan Endlicher